Ron James is a former member of the Ohio House of Representatives.

Living people
1940s births
Members of the Ohio House of Representatives